Bhagraj Choudhary was the MLA from Ahore in the Jalore district in the Rajasthan state. 1

Personal life
Bhagraj Choudhary born to Shri Modaram Choudhary on 16 April 1936 at Rakhi village near Siwana in Barmer district. He married Smt. Meera Bai. He has done BA and LLB in his education and he is professionally an advocate. He Died at 11 February 2022.

Political career
As MLA, he has been elected from Raniwara twice in 1962 and 1972  and from Ahore four times in 1985, 1993, 1998 and 2008. In 1985, he was elected as a Bharatiya Lok Dal candidate. Later he re-joined Indian National Congress. He had been minister in the state government. Presently he is Chairman of Committee on Subordinate Legislation and member of General Purpose Committee in state assembly.

References

 Bhagraj Choudhary
 याद आए भगराज: छह बार के विधायक रहे पूर्व मंत्री भगराज चौधरी को श्रद्धांजलि दी राजस्थान की विधानसभा ने

Rajasthani politicians
Living people
People from Jalore district
Indian National Congress politicians
Bharatiya Lok Dal politicians
20th-century Indian politicians
1936 births